The 2008 A-League Grand Final took place at Sydney Football Stadium in Sydney, Australia on 24 February 2008. It was the first A-League Grand Final played at a neutral home ground, due to Bluetongue Stadium being deemed by FFA to not have a sufficient capacity to hold the centrepiece of the A-League season. This move created a stir of controversy and was protested by the Central Coast Mariners, who won the right to host the match, but to no avail.

Route to the finals

Match

Summary
The first half of the game ended in a draw with neither side scoring a goal, though each had good scoring opportunities. Gary van Egmond made a risky change to his side's starting formation, playing with a back three. In the 64th minute Mark Bridge scored the only goal after Tony Vidmar slipped.

The game ended in controversy after Central Coast earned a corner late into extra time in the second half. As the ball was crossed into Newcastle's penalty area, it appeared to hit Newcastle player James Holland on the right arm, before it was cleared away. Mariners players immediately demanded a penalty, yet referee Mark Shield decided not to award one. The Mariners players, enraged, continued to scream at Shield, pressuring him for a penalty. Mariners keeper Danny Vukovic as a result of this frustration, hit Shields' arm away when the referee was penalizing one of Vukovic's teammates with a yellowcard. Shield then immediately awarded Vukovic with a red card. Vukovic would later be charged with striking a match official by the FFA, and was subsequently banned for 9 months, 3 of those months suspended. Due to this, Vukovic missed a significant portion of the next A-League season as well as the Olympic Games.

Details

Statistics

See also
2007–08 A-League
List of A-League honours

References

External links
Full Match highlights on YouTube
Official A-League Website

Final
A-League Men Grand Finals
Central Coast Mariners FC matches
Newcastle Jets FC matches
Soccer in Sydney